Otidea onotica, commonly known as hare's ear, is a species of apothecial fungus belonging to the family Pyronemataceae. This is a European species occurring singly or in small groups on soil in deciduous woodland, most often with beech trees. The colour is yellow with a pinkish tinge. White hairs cover the short stem.

References

Other sources

Otidea onotica at Species Fungorum

Pyronemataceae
Fungi described in 1801
Taxa named by Christiaan Hendrik Persoon